Liza Renlund (born 21 February 1997), sometimes referred to as Lisa Renlund, is a Swedish former footballer.

Club career
After starting her career with Älvsby IF, Renlund joined Piteå IF prior to the 2012 Damallsvenskan season. She appeared in 14 games in the Division 3 for Piteå IF 2 and was an unused substitute in one match in the Damallsvenskan. The following season she appeared in two matches in the Damallsvenskan but missed the majority of the season due to a knee injury. She later joined Umeå IK but did not appear in any matches due to problems with her knee that required two surgeries.

National team career
In 2013, Renlund was called up to the Swedish U-16 team to participate in the Nordic U-16 Championships in Iceland in July 2013. She appeared in 4 games, netting one goal.

References

External links 
 
Statistics at lagstatistik.se
Profile at svenskfotboll.se

1997 births
Living people
Swedish women's footballers
Umeå IK players
Piteå IF (women) players
Damallsvenskan players
Women's association football forwards